Daniel 'Dani' Fragoso Escribano (born 31 March 1982) is a Spanish former footballer who played as a defensive midfielder.

Club career
Born in Mataró, Barcelona, Catalonia, Fragoso played youth football for RCD Espanyol and Real Madrid. He made his senior debut with the former's B-team during the 2000–01 season, in Segunda División B, and spent most of his career in that tier, representing CF Extremadura, FC Barcelona B, Cádiz CF, UD Melilla, CD Atlético Baleares, CE L'Hospitalet, Lleida Esportiu and La Roda CF.

At the professional level, Fragoso appeared for Ciudad de Murcia – later renamed Granada 74 CF – Cádiz and Albacete Balompié, being relegated with all the clubs from Segunda División. With the second, he only missed two league games during the 2009–10 campaign, scoring in a 4–3 home win against Albacete.
  
On 3 March 2014, aged nearly 32, Fragoso moved abroad for the first time in his career, signing with Chivas USA in the Major League Soccer. Just five weeks later, however, he was waived, returning to his homeland and joining Lleida.

Honours
Cádiz
Segunda División B: 2008–09

References

External links

Stats and bio at Cadistas1910 

1982 births
Living people
People from Mataró
Sportspeople from the Province of Barcelona
Spanish footballers
Footballers from Catalonia
Association football midfielders
Segunda División players
Segunda División B players
Tercera División players
RCD Espanyol B footballers
AD Alcorcón footballers
CF Extremadura footballers
FC Barcelona Atlètic players
Ciudad de Murcia footballers
Granada 74 CF footballers
Cádiz CF players
Albacete Balompié players
UD Melilla footballers
CD Atlético Baleares footballers
CE L'Hospitalet players
Lleida Esportiu footballers
CD San Roque de Lepe footballers
La Roda CF players
CP Cacereño players
Real Jaén footballers
Major League Soccer players
Chivas USA players
Spanish expatriate footballers
Expatriate soccer players in the United States
Spanish expatriate sportspeople in the United States